India Green is an Indian cricket team. They compete for the NKP Salve Challenger Trophy. In 2011 the players were Harbhajan Singh (captain), Robin Uthappa, S. Anirudha, T. Suman, Mohnish Mishra, Ishank Jaggi, Mohd. Kaif, C.M. Gautham (wk), S. Ladda, Iqbal Abdulla, Abhimanyu Mithun, Samad Fallah, Ishwar Choudhary and S. Narwal.

References

Cricket teams in India
Organizations with year of establishment missing